Felino Maria Sandeo (1444–1503), often quoted under the Latin name of Felinus, was an Italian canonist of the fifteenth century.

Biography
He was born at Felino, in the Diocese of Reggio, in 1444.  He taught canon law from 1466 to 1474 at Ferrara, which was his family's native place, and at Pisa until 1484, when he became auditor of the Sacred Palace and lived at Rome. On 4 May 1495, he became Bishop of Penne and Atri and on 25 September of the same year Coadjutor Bishop of Lucca with right of succession. He became Bishop of Lucca in 1499.
 
He died at Lucca 1503, in October according to most writers, according to others at Rome on 6 September 1503.

Writings
Felino was a good compiler but lacked originality.
 
His chief work is Lectura, or Commentaria in varios titulos libri I, II, IV, et V Decretalium (see Hain, Repertor. bibliogr., II, n, 269–78, N. 14280–14325, published rather often, notably at Milan, 1504; Basle, 1567; Lyons, 1587).
 
He also published a Sermo de indulgentia, Repetitiones Consilia, and Epitome de regno Siciliae (s. 1., 1495).
 
Some unedited works are mentioned in Fabricius, Bib. latina mediae et infimae aetatis with additions by Mansi, II (Florence, 1858), 558.

Editions

Sources
 

1444 births
1503 deaths
Canon law jurists